This is a list of the National-Report Top 100 Nacional number-one songs of 2014. Chart rankings are based on radio play and are issued weekly. The data is compiled monitoring radio stations through an automated system in real-time.

Number ones be week

References

Number-one songs
Colombia
Colombian record charts